Fittingia is a genus of flowering plants in the primrose family Primulaceae, with all species native to New Guinea. They are shrubs or small trees typically found in the understory.

Species
Currently accepted species include: 

Fittingia carnosifolia Sleumer
Fittingia conferta (S.Moore) Sleumer
Fittingia grandiflora C.M.Hu
Fittingia headsiana Takeuchi
Fittingia mariae B.C.Stone
Fittingia paniculata Takeuchi
Fittingia tuberculata Sleumer
Fittingia tubiflora Mez
Fittingia urceolata Mez

References

Primulaceae
Primulaceae genera